Alfonso Muga Naredo (born 2 June 1944) is a Chilean scholar and researcher who served as head of the Pontifical Catholic University of Valparaíso (1998−2010).

References

External links
 PUCV Profile

1944 births
Living people
Instituto O'Higgins de Rancagua alumni
Pontifical Catholic University of Valparaíso alumni
Academic staff of the Pontifical Catholic University of Valparaíso
University of Chile alumni
Heads of universities in Chile
Heads of the Pontifical Catholic University of Valparaíso